The following outline is provided as an overview of and topical guide to the Republic of the Congo:

Republic of the Congo – also known as  Congo-Brazzaville or the Congo, is a sovereign country located in Central Africa.  It is bordered by Gabon, Cameroon, the Central African Republic, the Democratic Republic of the Congo, the Angolan exclave province of Cabinda, and the Gulf of Guinea.

The republic is a former French colony.  Upon independence in 1960, the former French region of Middle Congo became the Republic of the Congo. After a quarter century of Marxism, Congo became a multi-party democracy in 1992. However, a brief civil war in 1997 ended in the restoration of former Marxist President Denis Sassou Nguesso to power.

General reference 

 Pronunciation: 
 Common English country names: (The) Republic of the Congo, Congo-Brazzaville or Congo (Congo being ambiguous with Democratic Republic of the Congo)
 Official English country name: (The) Republic of the Congo
 Adjectives: Congolese, Congo
 Demonym(s):
 International rankings of the Republic of the Congo
 ISO country codes:  CG, COG, 178
 ISO region codes:  See ISO 3166-2:CG
 Internet country code top-level domain:  .cg

Geography of the Republic of the Congo 

Geography of the Republic of the Congo
 The Republic of the Congo is: a country
 Location:
 Eastern Hemisphere, on the Equator
 Africa
 Middle Africa
 Time zone:  UTC+01
 Time in the Republic of the Congo
 Extreme points of the Republic of the Congo
 High:  Mont Nabeba 
 Low:  South Atlantic Ocean 0 m
 Land boundaries:  5,504 km
 2,410 km
 1,903 km
 523 km
 467 km
 Central African Republic–Republic of the Congo border
 (Cabinda Province) 201 km 
 Angola–Republic of the Congo border
 Coastline:  Gulf of Guinea 169 km
 Atlas of the Republic of the Congo

Environment of the Republic of the Congo 

 Climate of the Republic of the Congo
 Ecoregions in the Republic of the Congo
 Geology of the Republic of the Congo
 Wildlife of the Republic of the Congo
 Fauna of the Republic of the Congo
 Birds of the Republic of the Congo
 Mammals of the Republic of the Congo
 Insects of the Republic of the Congo
 Butterflies of the Republic of the Congo
 Moths of the Republic of the Congo

Natural geographic features of the Republic of the Congo 

 Glaciers in the Republic of the Congo: none 
 Rivers of the Republic of the Congo
 World Heritage Sites in the Republic of the Congo: None

Regions and places in the Republic of the Congo 

 Subdivisions of the Republic of the Congo
 Renamed places in the Republic of the Congo

Ecoregions of the Republic of the Congo 

List of ecoregions in the Republic of the Congo
 Ecoregions in the Republic of the Congo

Administrative divisions of the Republic of the Congo 

Administrative divisions of the Republic of the Congo
 Departments of the Republic of the Congo
 Districts of the Republic of the Congo
 Communes of the Republic of the Congo

Departments of the Republic of the Congo 

Departments of the Republic of the Congo
 Departments of the Republic of the Congo by Human Development Index
 Bouenza Department
 Brazzaville
 Cuvette Department
 Cuvette-Ouest Department
 Kouilou Department
 Lékoumou Department
 Likouala Department
 Niari Department
 Plateaux Department
 Pointe-Noire
 Pool Department
 Sangha Department

Districts of the Republic of the Congo 

Districts of the Republic of the Congo

Communes of the Republic of the Congo 

Communes of the Republic of the Congo

Municipalities of the Republic of the Congo 

 Capital of the Republic of the Congo: Brazzaville
 Cities of the Republic of the Congo

Demography of the Republic of the Congo 

Demographics of the Republic of the Congo

Government and politics of the Republic of the Congo 

 Politics of the Republic of the Congo
 Form of government: unitary semi-presidential republic
 Capital of the Republic of the Congo: Brazzaville
 Political parties in the Republic of the Congo

Elections in the Republic of the Congo 

Elections in the Republic of the Congo
 2008 Republic of the Congo Senate election
 Parliamentary elections in the Republic of the Congo
 1959 Republic of the Congo parliamentary election
 1963 Republic of the Congo parliamentary election
 1973 People's Republic of the Congo parliamentary election
 1979 People's Republic of the Congo parliamentary election
 1984 People's Republic of the Congo parliamentary election
 1989 People's Republic of the Congo parliamentary election
 1992 Republic of the Congo parliamentary election
 1993 Republic of the Congo parliamentary election
 2002 Republic of the Congo parliamentary election
 2007 Republic of the Congo parliamentary election
 2012 Republic of the Congo parliamentary election
 2017 Republic of the Congo parliamentary election
 2022 Republic of the Congo parliamentary election
 Presidential elections in the Republic of the Congo
 1961 Republic of the Congo presidential election
 1963 Republic of the Congo presidential election
 1992 Republic of the Congo presidential election
 2002 Republic of the Congo presidential election
 2009 Republic of the Congo presidential election
 2016 Republic of the Congo presidential election
 2021 Republic of the Congo presidential election

Branches of the government of the Republic of the Congo 

 Government of the Republic of the Congo

Executive branch of the government of the Republic of the Congo 
 Head of state: President of the Republic of the Congo, Denis Sassou Nguesso
 Presidents of the Republic of the Congo
 First Lady of the Republic of the Congo
 Vice President of the Republic of the Congo
 Head of government: Prime Minister of the Republic of the Congo, Clément Mouamba
 Prime ministers of the Republic of the Congo
 Cabinet of the Republic of the Congo

Legislative branch of the government of the Republic of the Congo 

 Parliament of the Republic of the Congo (bicameral)
 Upper house: Senate
 presidents of the Senate of the Republic of the Congo
 Lower house: National Assembly
 Presidents of the National Assembly of the Republic of the Congo

Judicial branch of the government of the Republic of the Congo 

 Court system of the Republic of the Congo

Foreign relations of the Republic of the Congo 

 Foreign relations of the Republic of the Congo
 Republic of the Congo passport
 Diplomatic missions in the Republic of the Congo
 Diplomatic missions of the Republic of the Congo
 Apostolic Nunciature to the Republic of the Congo
 China–Republic of the Congo relations
 East Germany–People's Republic of the Congo relations
 Republic of the Congo–France relations
 Republic of the Congo–Holy See relations
 Republic of the Congo–Russia relations
 Republic of the Congo–South Africa relations
 Republic of the Congo–Turkey relations
 Republic of the Congo–United States relations
 Ambassadors of the Republic of the Congo to the United States
 Ambassadors of the United States to the Republic of the Congo
 Republic of the Congo–Yugoslavia relations

International organization membership 
The Republic of the Congo is a member of:

African, Caribbean, and Pacific Group of States (ACP)
African Development Bank Group (AfDB)
African Union (AU)
Conference des Ministres des Finances des Pays de la Zone Franc (FZ)
Development Bank of Central African States (BDEAC)
Economic and Monetary Community of Central Africa (CEMAC)
Food and Agriculture Organization (FAO)
Group of 77 (G77)
International Bank for Reconstruction and Development (IBRD)
International Civil Aviation Organization (ICAO)
International Criminal Court (ICCt)
International Criminal Police Organization (Interpol)
International Development Association (IDA)
International Federation of Red Cross and Red Crescent Societies (IFRCS)
International Finance Corporation (IFC)
International Fund for Agricultural Development (IFAD)
International Labour Organization (ILO)
International Maritime Organization (IMO)
International Monetary Fund (IMF)
International Olympic Committee (IOC)
International Organization for Migration (IOM)
International Telecommunication Union (ITU)

International Telecommunications Satellite Organization (ITSO)
International Trade Union Confederation (ITUC)
Inter-Parliamentary Union (IPU)
Multilateral Investment Guarantee Agency (MIGA)
Nonaligned Movement (NAM)
Organisation internationale de la Francophonie (OIF)
Organisation for the Prohibition of Chemical Weapons (OPCW)
United Nations (UN)
United Nations Conference on Trade and Development (UNCTAD)
United Nations Educational, Scientific, and Cultural Organization (UNESCO)
United Nations Industrial Development Organization (UNIDO)
United Nations Institute for Training and Research (UNITAR)
Universal Postal Union (UPU)
World Confederation of Labour (WCL)
World Customs Organization (WCO)
World Federation of Trade Unions (WFTU)
World Health Organization (WHO)
World Intellectual Property Organization (WIPO)
World Meteorological Organization (WMO)
World Tourism Organization (UNWTO)
World Trade Organization (WTO)

Law and order in the Republic of the Congo 

 Crime in the Republic of the Congo
 Human trafficking in the Republic of the Congo
 Child marriage in Republic of the Congo
 Law of the Republic of the Congo
 Capital punishment in the Republic of the Congo
 Constitution of the Republic of the Congo
 1963 Republic of the Congo constitutional referendum
 1973 Republic of the Congo constitutional referendum
 1979 Republic of the Congo constitutional referendum
 1992 Republic of the Congo constitutional referendum
 2002 Republic of the Congo constitutional referendum
 2015 Republic of the Congo constitutional referendum
 Election law of the Republic of the Congo
 Human rights in the Republic of the Congo
 LGBT rights in the Republic of the Congo
 Freedom of religion in the Republic of the Congo
 Marriage in the Republic of the Congo
 Child marriage in Republic of the Congo
 Polygamy in the Republic of the Congo
 Visa policy of the Republic of the Congo
 Visa requirements for Republic of the Congo citizens
 Law enforcement in the Republic of the Congo
 Capital punishment in the Republic of the Congo

Armed Forces of the Republic of the Congo 

 Armed Forces of the Republic of the Congo
 Command
 Commander-in-chief:
 Military ranks of Republic of the Congo
 Forces
 Army of the Republic of the Congo
 Air Force of the Republic of the Congo

Local government in the Republic of the Congo 

 Local government in the Republic of the Congo

History of the Republic of the Congo 

History of the Republic of the Congo

History of the Republic of the Congo, by period 

 Kingdom of Kongo (1390–1914)
 Kingdom of Loango (1550–1883)
 Kongo Civil War (1665–1709)
 Colonization of the Congo Basin (1876–1885)
 Atlantic slave trade
 French Congo (1882–1910)
 French Equatorial Africa (1910–1958)
 Fulbert Youlou
 Trois Glorieuses (1963)
 1966 Republic of the Congo coup d'état attempt
 1968 Republic of the Congo coup d'état
 People's Republic of the Congo (1970–1992)
 1972 Republic of the Congo coup d'état attempt
 1987 Republic of the Congo coup d'état attempt
 1990s in the Republic of the Congo
 First Civil War (1993–1994)]]
 Second Civil War (1997–1999)]]
 2002 Republic of the Congo constitutional referendum
 2002–2003 conflict in the Pool Department
 2015 Republic of the Congo constitutional referendum
 Pool War (2016–2017)
 COVID-19 pandemic in the Republic of the Congo (2019–)

History of the Republic of the Congo, by year 
 List of years in Republic of the Congo
 1990s in the Republic of the Congo
 1998 in the Republic of the Congo
 2017 in the Republic of the Congo
 2018 in the Republic of the Congo
 2020 in the Republic of the Congo
 2021 in the Republic of the Congo
 2022 in the Republic of the Congo

History of the Republic of the Congo, by subject 

 Wars involving the Republic of the Congo

Culture of the Republic of the Congo 

Culture of the Republic of the Congo
 Cuisine of the Republic of the Congo
 Languages of the Republic of the Congo
 Media in the Republic of the Congo
 Museums in the Republic of the Congo
 National symbols of the Republic of the Congo
 Coat of arms of the Republic of the Congo
 Flag of the Republic of the Congo
 National anthem of the Republic of the Congo
 People of the Republic of the Congo
 Persons from the Republic of the Congo
 Republic of the Congo writers
 Public holidays in the Republic of the Congo
 Scouting and Guiding in the Republic of the Congo
 Time in the Republic of the Congo
 World Heritage Sites in the Republic of the Congo: None

Art in the Republic of the Congo 

 Cinema of the Republic of the Congo
 Republic of the Congo films
 Music of the Republic of the Congo

Religion in the Republic of the Congo 

Religion in the Republic of the Congo
 Christianity in the Republic of the Congo
 Catholic Church in the Republic of the Congo
 Apostolic Nunciature to the Republic of the Congo
 Cathedrals in the Republic of the Congo
 Catholic dioceses in the Republic of the Congo
 The Church of Jesus Christ of Latter-day Saints in the Republic of the Congo
 Hinduism in the Republic of the Congo
 Islam in the Republic of the Congo
 Sikhism in the Republic of the Congo

Sports in the Republic of the Congo 

Sports in the Republic of the Congo
 Athletics in the Republic of the Congo
 Republic of the Congo records in athletics
 Basketball in the Republic of the Congo
 Republic of the Congo men's national basketball team
 Republic of the Congo men's national under-16 basketball team
 Republic of the Congo men's national under-18 basketball team
 Republic of the Congo women's national basketball team
 Football in the Republic of the Congo
 Football clubs in the Republic of the Congo
 Republic of the Congo at the African Games
 Republic of the Congo at the 2019 African Games
 Republic of the Congo at the Paralympics
 Republic of the Congo at the 2016 Summer Paralympics
 Republic of the Congo at the World Aquatics Championships
 Republic of the Congo at the 2011 World Aquatics Championships
 Republic of the Congo at the 2013 World Aquatics Championships
 Republic of the Congo at the 2015 World Aquatics Championships
 Republic of the Congo at the World Championships in Athletics
 Republic of the Congo at the 2009 World Championships in Athletics
 Republic of the Congo at the 2011 World Championships in Athletics
 Republic of the Congo at the 2013 World Championships in Athletics
 Republic of the Congo at the 2015 World Championships in Athletics
 Republic of the Congo at the 2017 World Championships in Athletics
 Republic of the Congo at the 2019 World Athletics Championships
 Rugby union in the Republic of the Congo
 Republic of the Congo national rugby union team
 Swimming in the Rupublic of the Congo
 Republic of the Congo records in swimming
 Volleyball in the Republic of the Congo
 Republic of the Congo women's national volleyball team

Republic of the Congo at the Olympics 
Republic of the Congo at the Olympics
 Flag bearers for the Republic of the Congo at the Olympics
 Republic of the Congo at the Summer Olympics
 Republic of the Congo at the 1964 Summer Olympics
 Republic of the Congo at the 1972 Summer Olympics
 Republic of the Congo at the 1980 Summer Olympics
 Republic of the Congo at the 1984 Summer Olympics
 Republic of the Congo at the 1988 Summer Olympics
 Republic of the Congo at the 1992 Summer Olympics
 Republic of the Congo at the 1996 Summer Olympics
 Republic of the Congo at the 2000 Summer Olympics
 Republic of the Congo at the 2004 Summer Olympics
 Republic of the Congo at the 2008 Summer Olympics
 Republic of the Congo at the 2012 Summer Olympics
 Republic of the Congo at the 2016 Summer Olympics
 Republic of the Congo at the 2020 Summer Olympics
 Republic of the Congo at the Summer Youth Olympics
 Republic of the Congo at the 2010 Summer Youth Olympics
 Republic of the Congo at the 2014 Summer Youth Olympics
 Republic of the Congo at the 2018 Summer Youth Olympics

Economy and infrastructure of the Republic of the Congo 

Economy of the Republic of the Congo
 Economic rank, by nominal GDP (2007): 122nd (one hundred and twenty second)
 Agriculture in the Republic of the Congo
 Cassava production in the Republic of the Congo
 Cannabis in the Republic of the Congo
 Banking in the Republic of the Congo
 Banks in the Republic of the Congo
 Buildings and structures in the Republic of the Congo
 Bridges in the Republic of the Congo
 Museums in the Republic of the Congo
 Lighthouses in the Republic of the Congo
 Communications in the Republic of the Congo
 Mass media in the Republic of the Congo
 Postal system in the Republic of the Congo
 Postage stamps and postal history of the Republic of the Congo
 Telecommunications in the Republic of the Congo
 Internet in the Republic of the Congo
 Telephone numbers in the Republic of the Congo
 Companies of the Republic of the Congo
Currency of the Republic of Congo: Franc
ISO 4217: XAF
 Energy in the Republic of the Congo
 Petroleum industry in the Republic of the Congo
 Power stations in the Republic of the Congo
 Health care in the Republic of the Congo
 Mining in the Republic of the Congo
 Transport in the Republic of the Congo
 Air transport in the Republic of the Congo
 Agence nationale de l'aviation civile (Republic of the Congo)
 Airlines of the Republic of the Congo
 Defunct airlines of the Republic of the Congo
 Airports in the Republic of the Congo
 Maritime transport in the Republic of the Congo
 Lighthouses in the Republic of the Congo
 Rail transport in the Republic of the Congo
 Railway stations in the Republic of the Congo
 Road transport in the Republic of the Congo
 Bridges in the Republic of the Congo
 Vehicle registration plates of the Republic of the Congo

Education in the Republic of the Congo 

Education in the Republic of the Congo
 Universities in the Republic of the Congo

Health in the Republic of the Congo 

Health in the Republic of the Congo
 COVID-19 pandemic in the Republic of the Congo

See also 

Republic of the Congo
Index of Republic of the Congo–related articles
List of Republic of the Congo-related topics
All pages with titles beginning with Republic of the Congo
All pages with titles beginning with Congo
All pages with titles beginning with Congo-Brazzaville
All pages with titles containing Republic of the Congo
All pages with titles containing Congo
All pages with titles containing Congo-Brazzaville
List of international rankings
Member state of the United Nations
Outline of Africa
Outline of geography

References

External links 

Congo
 1